William Brown (or Browne; 1737–1802) was a justice of the Massachusetts Superior Court of Judicature (the highest court of the Province of Massachusetts Bay) from 1774 to 1775, and Governor of Bermuda from 1781 to 1788.

Born in Salem, Massachusetts, he graduated from Harvard College in 1755.  He was judge in Essex County from 1770, and was appointed to the Massachusetts high court in 1774, following the death of Nathaniel Ropes. He was appointed by Governor Thomas Hutchinson, though his appointment was approved during the tenure of Governor Thomas Gage. Brown was forced out of office during the American Revolution, in part for refusing to reject the  heightened salary granted to judges by the Crown.  He was also appointed a mandamus councilor to Governor Gage, a post he refused to resign, earning him widespread dislike in Massachusetts.  This refusal led to the resignation of all of the officers of the Essex County militia regiment he led.  In 1774 he and his family fled to Boston.

Brown left Massachusetts in 1775, and his extensive family properties in Salem were seized by the state in 1784.  He was appointed Governor of Bermuda in 1781.  Arriving in Bermuda in 1782, he immediately took steps to improve the island's defenses, moving its capital to Hamilton and raising militia companies heavily populated with exiled Loyalists.  Following American independence, he sought to establish trade with the United States and make Bermuda a free port.

Brown eventually received some financial compensation from the British government for his family's losses.  He died in England in 1802.

References

1737 births
1802 deaths
People from Salem, Massachusetts
Harvard College alumni
Justices of the Massachusetts Supreme Judicial Court
Governors of Bermuda